Bhargav Ramesh Modha (born 20 October 1985) is an Indian-born English former first-class cricketer.

Modha was born at Jamnagar in October 1985. Emigrating to England as a child, he was educated at Oakham School, where he was a part of the England and Wales Cricket Board's fast-track spin bowling programme in 2004 under Terry Jenner. From Oakham he went up to Anglia Ruskin University, where he played first-class cricket for Cambridge UCCE in 2007, making three appearances against Northamptonshire, Derbyshire and Essex. Modha scored 41 runs in his three matches, in addition to taking 7 wickets with his leg break bowling.

Notes and references

External links

1985 births
Living people
People from Jamnagar
Indian emigrants to England
People educated at Oakham School
Alumni of Anglia Ruskin University
English cricketers
Cambridge MCCU cricketers
British sportspeople of Indian descent
British Asian cricketers